Clestrain Sound is a strait between Mainland Orkney and the Isle of Graemsay within the Orkney Islands, Scotland.

Clestrain Sound lies in the western entrance to Scapa Flow. Like other seaways within the Orkney Islands, Clestrain Sound has been recognized for many years to be warmed by the North Atlantic Drift current.

See also 
Mill of Ayreland
Burn of Ayreland

References

Sounds of Scotland
Landforms of Orkney